Manmohan Singh ministry may refer to:

First Manmohan Singh ministry, the Indian government headed by Manmohan Singh from 2004 to 2009
Second Manmohan Singh ministry, the Indian government headed by Manmohan Singh from 2009 to 2014

See also
 Manmohan Singh